Riccardo Bocchino (born 3 March 1988) is an Italian rugby union player. Bocchino, who is a fly-half, plays his club rugby for Aironi. He made his debut for Italy against Ireland on 6 February 2010.

Bocchino began his career at Capitolina, with whom he made his debut during the 2007–08 season. He played for the Italian under-20 team at the 2008 IRB Junior World Championship and Italy A at the 2009 IRB Nations Cup. Bocchino moved to Rovigo prior to the 2009–10 season. He was named in Nick Mallett's squad for the 2010 Six Nations Championship, making his debut against Ireland.

Bocchino joined Aironi in 2010 prior to their first season in the Celtic League.

References

1988 births
Living people
People from Viterbo
Italian rugby union players
Rugby union fly-halves
Italy international rugby union players
Cavalieri Prato players
Sportspeople from the Province of Viterbo